An amateur radio operator is someone who uses equipment at an amateur radio station to engage in two-way personal communications with other amateur operators on radio frequencies assigned to the amateur radio service. Amateur radio operators have been granted an amateur radio license by a governmental regulatory authority after passing an examination on applicable regulations, electronics, radio theory, and radio operation. As a component of their license, amateur radio operators are assigned a call sign that they use to identify themselves during communication. About three million amateur radio operators are currently active worldwide.

Amateur radio operators are also known as radio amateurs or hams. The term "ham" as a nickname for amateur radio operators originated in a pejorative usage (like "ham actor") by operators in commercial and professional radio communities, and dates to wired telegraphy. The word was subsequently adopted by amateur radio operators.

Demographics

Few governments maintain detailed demographic statistics of their amateur radio operator populations, aside from recording the total number of licensed operators. The majority of amateur radio operators worldwide reside in the United States, Japan, and the nations of East Asia, North America, and Europe. The top five countries by percentage of the population are Japan, Slovenia, Taiwan, South Korea and Thailand. Only the governments of Yemen and North Korea currently prohibit their citizens from becoming amateur radio operators. In some countries, acquiring an amateur radio license is difficult because of the bureaucratic processes or fees that place access to a license out of reach for most citizens. Most nations permit foreign nationals to earn an amateur radio license, but very few amateur radio operators are licensed in multiple countries.

Gender
In the vast majority of countries, the population of amateur radio operators is predominantly male. In China, 12% of amateur radio operators are women, while approximately 15% of amateur radio operators in the United States are women. The Young Ladies Radio League is an international organization of female amateur radio operators.

A male amateur radio operator can be referred to as an OM, an abbreviation used in Morse code telegraphy for "old man", regardless of the operator's age. A single female amateur radio operator can be referred to as a YL, from the abbreviation used for "young lady", regardless of the operator's age.  A licensed married female is sometimes referred to as an XYL.

Age
Most countries do not have a minimum age requirement in order to earn an amateur radio license and become an amateur radio operator. Although the number of amateur radio operators in many countries increases from year to year, the average age of amateur radio operators is relatively high. In some countries, the average age is over 80 years old, with most amateur radio operators earning their license in their 40s or 50s.

The unfavourable age distribution has led to a slow decrease in amateur operator numbers in most industrialised countries due to attrition, but in countries which do not apply yearly licence fees, the effects are not immediately noticed. It has been estimated from German statistics, which are considered the most reliable, that the net decrease currently is in the order of 1 to 1.5% per year. Average age is approaching 70 in most European countries.

Some national radio societies have responded to the aging ham population by developing programs specifically to encourage youth participation in amateur radio, such as the American Radio Relay League's Amateur Radio Education and Technology Program. The World Wide Young Contesters organization promotes youth involvement, particularly among Europeans, in competitive radio contesting. A strong tie also exists between the amateur radio community and the Scouting movement to introduce radio technology to youth. WOSM's annual Jamboree On The Air is Scouting's largest activity, with a half million Scouts and Guides speaking with each other using amateur radio each October.

US amateurs by state

NOTE:
AA..US Armed Forces Americas
AE..US Armed Forces Africa/Canada/Europe/Middle East
AP..US Armed Forces Pacific
AS..American Samoa
GU..Guam
MP..Mariana Islands
PR..Puerto Rico
VI..US Virgin Islands

Canadian amateurs by province

NOTE:
ZZ..Canadian amateurs outside of Canada

Silent Key

When referring to a person, the phrase Silent Key, and its abbreviation SK, is a euphemism for an amateur radio operator who is deceased. The procedural signal "" (or "") has historically been used in Morse code as the last signal sent from a station before ending operation, usually just before shutting off the transmitter. Since this was the last signal received by other operators, the code was adopted to refer to any amateur radio operator who is deceased, regardless of whether they were known to have used telegraphy in their communications.

Gallery

Notable amateur radio operators

References

External links
Amateur radio reference guide - Technical specifications and manuals

Operator